Elliott Mark Whitehouse (born 27 October 1993) is an English professional footballer who plays as a midfielder for National League side Scunthorpe United.

Whitehouse is a product of Sheffield United's academy and had loan spells with York City and Alfreton Town before being released in 2014. He joined Notts County and after a loan spell with Nuneaton Town was released in 2015. He had a short spell with FC Halifax Town before joining Nuneaton Town permanently. In 2016, Whitehouse joined Lincoln City, helping them to promotion to League Two and scoring the only goal in the 2018 EFL Trophy Final. He moved on to Grimsby Town and Forest Green Rovers, spending two season with each club.

Early life
Whitehouse was born in Worksop, Nottinghamshire.

Club career

Sheffield United

Whitehouse captained the Sheffield United youth team that reached the final of the FA Youth Cup in the 2010–11 season, only to lose to Manchester United. Top scorer for United's youth and reserve teams in 2011–12, with a total of 17 goals, Whitehouse made his first-team debut on 1 January 2013 in a 2–2 away draw against Doncaster Rovers. Having made five appearances during 2012–13, Whitehouse signed a new contract with United in June 2013.

On 12 September 2013, Whitehouse joined League Two club York City on an initial one-month youth loan. He made his debut two days later in a 2–1 home defeat to Mansfield Town. On 11 October 2013, his loan was extended until 5 January 2014, having made five appearances for York. York opted against extending his loan when it expired, and he finished his spell at the club with 18 appearances. On 22 March 2014, Whitehouse joined Conference Premier club Alfreton Town on loan until the end of 2013–14, his debut coming two days later as a 64th-minute substitute in a 2–0 away defeat to FC Halifax Town. Whitehouse made four appearances for Alfreton before returning to Sheffield United at the end of the season, only to be released when his contract expired.

Notts County
On 6 August 2014, Whitehouse signed for League One club Notts County on a one-year contract, after impressing on trial by scoring three goals in pre-season. He joined Conference Premier club Nuneaton Town on 31 January 2015 on a one-month loan and debuted the following day in a 1–0 defeat away to Forest Green Rovers. He made five appearances for Nuneaton, and after returning to County scored his first goal for the club on 21 March 2015 in a 4–1 away defeat to Milton Keynes Dons. Having made eight appearances and scored one goal for County in 2014–15, he was released by the club in May 2015.

FC Halifax Town and Nuneaton Town
Whitehouse signed for National League club FC Halifax Town on 28 May 2015. He made his debut in a 3–1 away defeat to Boreham Wood on 8 August 2015. He had made four appearances for Halifax when he signed for National League North club Nuneaton Town for an undisclosed fee on 4 September 2015.

Lincoln City
Whitehouse signed for National League club Lincoln City on 20 October 2016 for an undisclosed fee. He finished 2016–17 with 34 appearances and 6 goals as Lincoln were promoted to League Two as National League champions. Whitehouse scored the only goal as Lincoln beat Shrewsbury Town 1–0 at Wembley Stadium on 8 April in the 2018 EFL Trophy Final, with a close-range shot in the 16th minute.

Grimsby Town
Whitehouse was offered new contract by Lincoln at the end of the 2017–18 season but instead signed for their local rivals and fellow League Two club Grimsby Town on 15 June 2018 on a two-year contract. Whitehouse suffered a ruptured anterior cruciate ligament injury during pre-season training in July 2018, meaning he would miss the full 2018–19 season.

Forest Green Rovers
On 10 August 2020, Whitehouse signed for Forest Green Rovers on a two-year deal. Following Forest Green's promotion to League One as champions during the 2021–22 season, Whitehouse was among seven players released at the end of the season.

Scunthorpe United
On 2 June 2022, Whitehouse joined newly-relegated National League side Scunthorpe United on trial and played in a 3-2 pre-season defeat against Middlesbrough. On 7 July he signed a one-year contract.

On 2 December 2022, Whitehouse joined National League North side Spennymoor Town on a one-month loan.

International career
Whitehouse made his debut for the England national C team on 5 June 2016 in a 4–3 home defeat to Slovakia under-21s in the 2015–17 International Challenge Trophy. He scored his first goal on 16 November 2016, with a seventh-minute header in a 2–1 away win over Estonia under-23s, a result that meant England reached the International Challenge Trophy final as group runners-up.

Career statistics

Honours
Lincoln City
National League: 2016–17
EFL Trophy: 2017–18
Forest Green Rovers
League Two: 2021–22

References

External links

Profile  at the Grimsby Town F.C. website

1993 births
Living people
Footballers from Worksop
English footballers
England semi-pro international footballers
Association football midfielders
English Football League players
National League (English football) players
Sheffield United F.C. players
York City F.C. players
Alfreton Town F.C. players
Notts County F.C. players
Nuneaton Borough F.C. players
FC Halifax Town players
Lincoln City F.C. players
Grimsby Town F.C. players
Forest Green Rovers F.C. players
Scunthorpe United F.C. players
Spennymoor Town F.C. players